Sayed Mohammad Reza Kordestani (December 11, 1893July 3, 1924) was an Iranian political writer and poet who used the pen name Mirzadeh Eshghi.

Biography
He was born in Hamadan, the son of Hajj Sayed Abolghasam Kordestani; he learned French in the Ecole d'Alliance, and moved to Istanbul for a while. He is particularly famous for writing the opera Rastakhiz Iran (Resurrected Iran), which was a reflection of his patriotic spirit.

After returning to Iran and spending time with his family in Tehran, he published newspapers in which he fiercely attacked the political system of Iran. He is remembered for writing six plays; his Noruz nameh is particularly famous. He also published a paper called Twentieth Century and predicted his early death repeatedly.

Death
Eshghi was murdered by two unknown gunmen in his house in Tehran. He was buried in Ibn Babawayh Cemetery in Shahr-e Ray, near Tehran.

Works
Plays
Operay-e-Rastakhiz-e-Mehr-e-Yaran (Written in Istanbul)
Kafan-e-Siah or Black Shroud (Written in Tehran)
Resurrected Iranian Kings (Written in Istanbul)

References

External links

Persian-language poets
People from Hamadan
People of the Persian Constitutional Revolution
1893 births
1924 deaths
20th-century poets